The 1968 United States Senate election in Arkansas was held on November 5, 1968. 

Incumbent Democratic Senator J. William Fulbright was re-elected to a fifth term, defeating Democratic and Republican challengers.

Democratic primary

Candidates
 J. William Fulbright, incumbent U.S. Senator
Bob Hayes, resident of Calico Rock
Foster Johnson, candidate for U.S. Senate in 1966
 James D. Johnson, former Associate Justice of the Arkansas Supreme Court and 1966 nominee for Governor of Arkansas

Results
The primary was held on July 30.

General election

Results

See also 
 1968 United States Senate elections

References 

1968
Arkansas
United States Senate